Aadaalla Majaka is a 1995 Indian Telugu-language romantic film written by and directed by Muthyala Subbaiah. The film stars Vikram, Ooha, and Ali in the leading roles, while Sudhakar plays a supporting role.

Plot 
The plot revolves around paying guests staying in a female-only homestay who are self-identified misandrists.

Cast 

 Vikram as Vikram
 Ooha as Bhanu Rekha aka Sivaranjini
 Ali as Krishnamurthy "Kittu"
 Kalpana
 Sri Lakshmi
 Sudhakar
 Brahmanandam
 Ajay Rathnam
 Satyanarayana
 AVS
 P. Ravishankar
 Narra Venkateswara Rao
 Suthivelu
 P. R. Varalakshmi
 Gayathri
 Ilavarasi
 Srikanya
Chalapathi Rao
Ramya Krishnan in a song (Tamil version)

Release
The film was later dubbed and released in Tamil under the title Marri by Vijay Sri Film Productions, as a result of Vikram's new found saleability after the release of Sethu (1999). The storyline was heavily edited, with dubbed sequences featuring actresses Ramya Krishnan and Simran added to the film. The film was commercially successful. Following the success of Gemini (2002), the film was dubbed and released again in Tamil as Vahini.

Vikram and Ali later starred together in Ooha.

Soundtrack 
The soundtrack album was composed by Raj Bhaskar.

References 

1995 films
Indian romance films
Telugu remakes of Malayalam films
1990s Telugu-language films
1990s romance films
Films directed by Muthyala Subbaiah